Necydalis mellita is a longhorn beetle in the family Cerambycidae.

The very long and slender body, colouration, the short elytra, exposing the wings and the constricted pronotum of beetles in this genus are an instance of Batesian mimicry.

Description
The antenna are longer than the body, and with its black and red colouring, elongate body and short elytra, it resembles a wasp.

References

Necydalinae
Beetles described in 1838